Vigdís Finnbogadóttir (born 15 April 1930) is an Icelandic politician who served as the fourth president of Iceland from 1980 to 1996. She was the world's first woman who was democratically elected as president. With a presidency of exactly sixteen years, she also remains longest-serving elected female head of state of any country to date. Currently, she is a UNESCO Goodwill Ambassador, and a member of the Club of Madrid. 
She is also to-date Iceland's only female president.

Early life
Vigdís Finnbogadóttir was born at Reykjavík on 15 April 1930. Her father, Finnbogi Rútur Þorvaldsson, was a civil engineer, as well as a professor at the University of Iceland. Her mother, Sigríður Eiríksdóttir, was a nurse and the chairperson of the Icelandic Nurses Association. They had two children: Vigdís and then a son, Þorvaldur, a year later. After passing her matriculation exam in 1949, Vigdís studied French and French literature at the University of Grenoble and the Sorbonne in Paris from 1949 to 1953, then studied the history of theater at the University of Copenhagen. She then acquired a BA in French and English, as well as a Professional Graduate Certificate in Education, at the University of Iceland. She married a physician in 1954, but divorced in 1963, and at the age of 41 she adopted a daughter, becoming the first single woman in Iceland to be allowed to adopt a child.

Vigdís participated in the 1960s and 1970s in numerous rallies held to protest against the U.S. military presence in Iceland (and in particular at Keflavík). Every year hundreds—sometimes thousands—walked the 50-km road to Keflavík and chanted "Ísland úr NATO, herinn burt" (literally: Iceland out of NATO, the military away).

Artistic and academic career
After graduation, Vigdís taught French and French drama at the university and worked with experimental theatre. She worked with the Reykjavík Theatre Company from 1954 to 1957 and again from 1961 to 1964. During the summers, she also worked as a tour guide. Vigdís taught French at Menntaskólinn í Reykjavík 1962–67 and at Menntaskólinn við Hamrahlíð from 1967 to 1972. She also taught for a while at University of Iceland, as well as holding French courses on the Icelandic state television.

She was the Artistic Director of the Reykjavík Theatre Company, later the Reykjavík City Theatre from 1972 to 1980. From 1976 to 1980, she was a member of the Advisory Committee on Cultural Affairs in the Nordic countries.

In 1996, she became founding chair of the Council of Women World Leaders at the John F. Kennedy School of Government at Harvard University. Two years later she was appointed president of the United Nations Educational, Scientific and Cultural Organization World Commission on the Ethics of Scientific Knowledge and Technology.

President of Iceland

The Icelandic women's movement has a long history. During the International Women's Year in 1975 Icelandic women attracted great attention when they organized a general strike to show how important women's undervalued work was. 90 per cent of the Icelandic women went on strike. And at the presidential election in 1980 the women's movement focused on electing a woman. After much persuasion Vigdís accepted to run against three male candidates. She was the first woman in the world to be elected president in a democratic election. She was narrowly elected, with 33.6 percent of the national vote, while her nearest rival got 32.1 percent. She became very popular and was subsequently reelected three times, unopposed in 1984, with 94.6 percent of the votes against another woman in 1988 and unopposed in 1992. In 1996 she decided not to run for reelection. She was the longest serving Icelandic president (with four terms) until Ólafur Ragnar Grímsson was elected to his fifth term in 2012.

Although the Icelandic presidency is largely a ceremonial position, Vigdís took an active role as environmental activist and fought for Icelandic language and culture, acting as a cultural ambassador in promoting the country. She emphasized the role of smaller states and hosted a crucial summit between U.S. President Ronald Reagan and Soviet leader Mikhail Gorbachev in 1986. She had as her motto: 'Never let the women down' and worked specifically to promote girls' education. She was also aware of her role as a model for young women.

In 1993, the work Mitt Folk, commissioned by the British government, by the composer Oliver Kentish was dedicated to her as a gift from the United Kingdom to Iceland celebrating the 50th anniversary of the republic.

Retirement
Since 1998, Vigdís Finnbogadóttir has been UNESCO's Goodwill Ambassador for languages.

She is also a member of the Fondation Chirac's honour committee, ever since the foundation was launched in 2008 by former French president Jacques Chirac in order to promote world peace.

Honours

National honours
:
 Grand Cross with Collar of the Order of the Falcon (1 August 1980)

Foreign honours

:
 Knight of the Order of the Elephant (25 February 1981)
:
 Grand Cross of the Order of the Legion of Honour (12 April 1982)
 Knight of the Ordre des Arts et des Lettres
:
 Grand Cross with Collar of the Order of the White Rose (1982) 
:
 Grand Cross Special Class Order of Merit of the Federal Republic of Germany (1988)
:
 Knight Grand Cross with Collar of the Order of Merit of the Italian Republic (5 October 1987)
:
 Knight of the Order of the Gold Lion of the House of Nassau (1986)
:
 Grand Cross with Collar of the Order of St. Olav (21 October 1981)
:
 Knight Grand Cross of the Order of the Netherlands Lion (18 September 1985)
:
 Knight Grand Cross with Collar of the Order of Charles III (11 September 1985)
:
 Member with Collar of the Royal Order of the Seraphim (8 October 1981)
:
 Honorary Dame Grand Cross of the Order of the Bath (25 June 1990)
 Honorary Dame Grand Cross of the Order of St Michael and St George (18 February 1982)

Honorary degrees
She has received honorary degrees from the following universities:
University of Grenoble, France (1985)
University of Bordeaux, France (1987)
Smith College, U.S. (1988)
Luther College, U.S. (1989)
University of Manitoba, Canada (1989)
University of Nottingham, Great Britain (1990)
University of Tampere, Finland (1990)
University of Gothenburg, Sweden (1990)
The Gakushuin University in Tokyo, Japan (1991)
University of Miami, U.S. (1993)
University of Trondheim, Norway (1993)
St. Mary's University in Halifax, Canada (1996)
University of Leeds, Great Britain (1996)
Memorial University of Newfoundland, Canada (1997)
University of Guelph, Canada (1998)
University of Iceland, Iceland (2000)
Vigdís is a member of the Club of Madrid, an independent non-profit organization composed of 81 democratic former Presidents and Prime Ministers from 57 countries.

See also
Where to Invade Next

References

External links

Official CV
Video interview by the Nordic Culture Fund 
Video interview by the School of Humanities of the University of Iceland 
Video message for the Women in Parliaments Global Forum 

|-

1930 births
Living people
Vigdis Finnbogadottir
Vigdis Finnbogadottir
UNESCO Goodwill Ambassadors
Grenoble Alpes University alumni
Harvard Kennedy School staff
University of Paris alumni
University of Copenhagen alumni
University of Iceland alumni
Academic staff of the University of Iceland
Women presidents
Vigdis Finnbogadottir
Grand Croix of the Légion d'honneur
Recipients of the Ordre des Arts et des Lettres
Recipients of the Order of the Netherlands Lion
Order of the White Rose of Finland
Knights Grand Cross with Collar of the Order of Merit of the Italian Republic
Grand Crosses Special Class of the Order of Merit of the Federal Republic of Germany
Honorary Dames Grand Cross of the Order of the Bath
Honorary Dames Grand Cross of the Order of St Michael and St George
20th-century women rulers
Icelandic women diplomats
Vigdis Finnbogadottir
Female heads of state
Icelandic expatriates in France
Recipients of the Order of the Falcon